Making Monsters is an American TV series which follows the work at Distortions, a company in Greeley, Colorado which produces frightening animatronics for haunted attractions.  Since 2011, the series airs on the Travel Channel annually from late September to late October, in the weeks before Halloween.

External links

Travel Channel original programming
2010s American reality television series
2011 American television series debuts
2013 American television series endings